Keturah was a concubine and later wife of biblical patriarch Abraham. It may also refer to:

People (given name)
 Keturah Anderson (born 1986), Canadian athlete
 Keturah Kamugasa (d. 2017), Ugandan writer and journalist
 Keturah Sorrell (1912–2012), English opera singer (soprano)
 Keturah Moss Leitch Taylor, wife of Kentucky settlers David Leitch (1753–1794) and (after Leitch's death) James Taylor (1769–1848)

Places
 Diamond Keturah, U.S. Virgin Islands, settlement
 Keturah, kibbutz (settlement) in southern Israel

Other
 Keturah and Lord Death, novel by Martine Leavitt
 Hotel Keturah, historic hotel in South Carolina

See also
 Katura Marae (born 1989), Vanuatuan athlete